Alexander Pallestrang (born April 4, 1990) is an Austrian professional ice hockey player currently Captain for Pioneers Vorarlberg of the ICE Hockey League (ICEHL).

He formerly played with EHC Black Wings Linz and EC Red Bull Salzburg.

Pallestrang participated with the Austrian national team at the 2015 IIHF World Championship.

References

External links

1990 births
Living people
Austrian ice hockey defencemen
People from Bregenz
EHC Black Wings Linz players
EC Red Bull Salzburg players
Sportspeople from Vorarlberg